Loop 1604 is the outer highway loop encircling San Antonio, Texas, spanning approximately . Originally constructed as a two-lane highway, the northern segment of the route, from US 90 in western San Antonio to Kitty Hawk Road in northeastern Bexar County, has been upgraded to a four-lane freeway. Loop 1604 is designated the Charles W. Anderson Loop in honor of former Bexar County Judge Charles W. Anderson, who died from cancer in 1964 after serving for 25 years.

Route description
Loop 1604 forms a complete loop around the city of San Antonio and is the outer of two loops around the city with I-410 being the inner loop. The route has portions that are built to freeway standards, portions built as a divided highway, and portions that are just a two-lane rural road. As with I-410, the city's inner loop, the northern half is more urbanized and the southern half, for the most part, remains rural.

The loop officially begins and ends at I-10 east of San Antonio. It heads south from I-10 as a two-lane road and turns towards the southeast and intersects FM 1346, FM 1518, and FM 3465 while turning back towards the south and reaching a junction with US 87 in Lone Oak. Continuing to the south, Loop 1604 has a second intersection with FM 3465, an intersection with FM 3432 as the road turns towards the southwest and a junction with US 181 near Calaveras Lake. Heading southwest from US 181, the highway intersects FM 327 as it enters the city of Elmendorf. It intersects FM 327 once again as it leaves Elmendorf heading towards the southwest. At FM 1303, Loop 1604 turns towards the west before a junction with I-37.

Continuing west through the southern portions of Bexar County, the loop intersects FM 1937 (South Flores Road) and FM 3499 before an interchange with US 281. The highway continues to the west to an interchange with SH 16, passing to the south of the Toyota Motor Manufacturing Texas plant. The highway continues to the west and begins to curve towards the north as it enters the city limits of Somerset and an intersection with FM 2790 (Somerset Road). Completing the turn to the north as it leaves Somerset, Loop 1604 heads north to an interchange with I-35. The highway heads north after the I-35 interchange to an intersection with FM 2536 (Old Pearsall Road) before an interchange with US 90.

North of US 90, Loop 1604 becomes a four-lane divided highway with median crossings only located at traffic lights and turnarounds at those traffic lights to facilitate traffic flow of vehicles turning around to go in the opposite direction. The highway enters the San Antonio city limits near Marbach Road and follows near the city limit. Major intersections along this stretch include Marbach Road, FM 1957 (Potranco Road) and Wiseman Boulevard. The loop continues north near the campus of Northwest Vista College to a junction with the western terminus of SH 151. The intersection is signalized but southbound traffic is not required to stop due to no left hand turns from SH 151 to Loop 1604. Westbound traffic from SH 151 are either routed to the northbound main lanes of Loop 1604 or the northbound frontage road of Loop 1604.  In 2016, TxDOT unveiled plans to upgrade the section from US 90 to SH 151 to a freeway starting in late 2016,  and Google Earth satellite imagery showed this freeway under construction in 2017-2018.

The freeway portion starts as the loop curves towards the northeast at the junction with SH 151.  Loop 1604 has diamond interchanges at FM 471 (Culebra Road), Shaenfield Road, New Guilbeau Road, Braun Road, and SH 16 (Bandera Road).

The freeway continues to the northeast with interchanges at FM 1560 (Hausman Road) and Babcock Road. The freeway begins to head east at the Babcock Road interchange and passes near the UTSA main campus, the Shops at La Cantera and Six Flags Fiesta Texas. The freeway continues to the east to a cloverleaf interchange with I-10. East of I-10, the freeway has interchanges with Lockhill-Selma Road, FM 1535 (Military Highway), Bitters Road and Huebner Road. As it passes through the north side of San Antonio, the freeway has interchanges with FM 2696 (Blanco Road) and Stone Oak Parkway before reaching US 281, which connect by way of an interchange completed in December 2012.

Continuing east from the US 281 interchange, the freeway has interchanges with several local roads to include Gold Canyon Drive, Redland Road, Bulverde Road, and O'Connor Road. The freeway continues east to interchanges with Judson Road and Green Mountain Road before it curves to head to the southeast. Now heading southeast, the freeway has an interchange at FM 2252 near Rolling Oaks Mall and an interchange at Lookout Road before it leaves the San Antonio city limits. Upon leaving San Antonio, the freeway enters the Live Oak city limits before a cloverleaf interchange at I-35. Southeast of I-35, Loop 1604 enters the Universal City city limits before reaching an interchange with SH 218, which provides access to Randolph Air Force Base. TXDOT has upgraded two intersections between the interchange at SH 218 and Kitty Hawk Road, where Loop 1604 used to have two at-grade turn-offs, one at Palisades Drive and one at Granada Drive. These intersections are now separated from the main lanes and are relegated to the service road at these locations. The same applies to two former at-grade turn-offs southeast of the Kitty Hawk Road interchange at Meadowland Drive and Byrd Boulevard. Meadowland and Byrd now do not intersect the main lanes of Loop 1604 . The last two interchanges of the freeway are located at FM 1976 and FM 78. Once in the Converse city limits, Loop 1604 remains a 4-lane divided highway, but has at-grade intersections. The highway passes by the western boundary of Randolph Air Force Base before curving to the south. The highway re-enters San Antonio city limits prior to its interchange at I-10 at its official beginning and end.

History
Loop 1604 was designated on June 30, 1977, after FM 1604 was combined with a large portion of FM 1518 to complete a larger loop around San Antonio. Three bypasses were completed in the early 1980s: on December 12, 1979, FM 1937 was extended to replace a bypassed portion near Losoya; on March 3, 1981, FM 327 was designated as the through route when Loop 1604 was rerouted around Elmendorf; and in 1983, Loop 1604 was routed around Lone Oak, creating FM 3465 over the previous routing.

Construction recently finished to expand the freeway section of Loop 1604 from SH 16 (Bandera Road) to FM 471 (Culebra Road). New overpasses were built at Shaenfield Road, New Guilbeau Road, and Braun Road. TxDOT has expanded the project further south to SH 151 and US 90, creating a direct flyover overpass from southbound Loop 1604 to eastbound US 90. The expansion was deemed necessary due to the growth of San Antonio's far west side.

Future
TxDOT plans to widen Loop 1604 from four lanes to ten between SH 16 (Bandera Road) near Helotes and I-35 in Universal City. The expansion will add two travel lanes and one HOV lane in each direction. Additionally, the project will replace the cloverleaf interchange at I-10 with a five-level stack interchange, reconfigure the layout of exit and entrance ramps, along with other improvements. Segment 1 (SH 16 to I-10) officially broke ground on July 26, 2021 and is expected to be completed by 2024; segment 2, the reconstruction of the I-10 interchange, will be completed in 2027. Construction of segment 3, from I-10 to US 281, is expected to begin in 2021; segments 4 and 5 are currently unfunded.

Junction list
Clockwise reads down and counterclockwise reads up.

See also

References

Beltways in the United States
1604
Transportation in Bexar County, Texas
Loop 1604